John Charles Smethams (born 1886) was an English professional footballer who played as a winger.

References 

 

1886 births
Year of death unknown
People from Congleton
English footballers
Association football wingers
Burnley F.C. players
Blackburn Rovers F.C. players
Southport F.C. players
English Football League players
Sportspeople from Cheshire